Natural Information Society is a music ensemble described as “ecstatic minimalism”. The group formed in 2010 and is led by multi-instrumentalist and composer Joshua Abrams. NPR called the group a "staple" of the underground music scene in Chicago. Their performances often include the paintings of Lisa Alvarado.

According to Musicworks, Natural Information Society's performances place "a singular emphasis on the human and the humane in music in the midst of a galloping digitized industry". The Guardian gave the group's album Simultonality four out of five stars, The New York Times described it as "at once tensile and hypnotic", while Rolling Stone named it to their list of the "20 Best Avant Albums of 2017". Pitchfork named their double album Magnetoception #2 on their "Best Experimental Albums of 2015". The Stranger called the group's release Automaginary one of the "Top 10 Records of 2015" and it was also named by Spin as one of its "20 Best Avant Albums of 2015". The New York Times described their first album Natural Information as "one of the rough gems of the post-everything musical era”.

Natural Information Society's albums have been released by Eremite Records and a collaboration album with Bitchin Bajas was released by Drag City.

See also
 Music of Chicago

References

External links 
 Natural Information Society

American jazz ensembles from Illinois
2010 establishments in Illinois
Drag City (record label) artists
Musical groups from Chicago